This is a list of the South African Commando Units. It includes some units which were created to assist in the training or support of the Commandos.

Unit List

Group 1

Group 2

Group 3

Group 4

Group 5

Group 6

Group 7

Group 8

Group 9

Group 10

Group 11

Group 12

Group 13

Group 14

Group 15

Group 16

Group 17

Group 18

Group 19

Group 20

Group 21

Group 22

Group 23

Group 24

Group 25

Group 26

Group 27

Group 28

Group 29

Group 30

Group 31

Group 32

Group 33

Group 34

Group 35

Group 36

Group 39

Group 40

Group 41

Group 42

Group 46

Group 50

Unsorted

Notes

References

External links 

 South African Police Service
 

Army units and formations of South Africa
South African Commando Units
Commando units